Robert J. "Bobby" Morse (born October 3, 1965) is a former professional American football running back in the National Football League (NFL) for the Philadelphia Eagles and New Orleans Saints.

1965 births
Living people
Sportspeople from Muskegon, Michigan
Players of American football from Michigan
American football running backs
Michigan State Spartans football players
Philadelphia Eagles players
New Orleans Saints players